Al-Haj Sahib Rahman was elected to represent Kunar Province in Afghanistan's Wolesi Jirga, the lower house of its National Legislature, in 2005.
He was assassinated by a suicide bomber on November 6, 2007.

A report on Kunar prepared at the Navy Postgraduate School stated that he  was an associate of Pir Gailani .
It stated he was from the Mushwarnary tribe, and a member of the Pashtun ethnic group.
It stated he sat on the economics committee.

References

Politicians of Kunar Province
2007 deaths
Assassinated Afghan politicians
People murdered in Afghanistan
Afghan terrorism victims
Members of the House of the People (Afghanistan)
Year of birth missing